A Joyful Noise is an album of Christmas music, released by American country music artist Jo Dee Messina. Her first Christmas album, it was released in 2002 on Curb Records. Its title track peaked at number 16 on the Billboard Hot Adult Contemporary Tracks charts in 2002.

Track listing

Personnel
Jo Dee Messina - lead vocals
Sam Bacco - percussion
Robert Bailey - backing vocals 
Pat Bergesen - harmonica
Mike Brignardello - bass guitar
Tom Bukovac - acoustic guitar, electric guitar
Spencer Campbell - bass guitar
Lisa Cochran - backing vocals
Everett Drake - backing vocals
Howard Duck - organ, piano
Stuart Duncan - mandolin
Kim Fleming - backing vocals
Ralph Friedrichsen - backing vocals
Vince Gill - backing vocals
Carl Gorodetzky - contractor
Vicki Hampton - backing vocals
Yvonne Hodges - backing vocals
Crystal Hooper - backing vocals
Jenkins Edward - backing vocals
John Jorgenson - acoustic guitar
Sherri Kibble - backing vocals
Jennifer Kummer - French horn
Derrick Lee - backing vocals
Paul Leim - drums
Sam Levine - flute, piccolo
Jenna Maher - children's chorus
Brent Mason - electric guitar
Gene Miller - backing vocals
The Nashville String Machine - strings
Steve Nathan - keyboards, piano
Craig Nelson - string bass
Bobby Ogdin - keyboards
Kim Parent - backing vocals
Linda Patterson - French horn
Tom Roady - percussion
Kenny Rogers - guest vocals
Calvin Smith - French horn
Emily Smith - children's chorus
Bergen White - conductor
Lonnie Wilson - drums
Bill Woodworth - English horn
Cyndi Reynolds Wyatt - harp

Chart performance

References
[ A Joyful Noise] at Allmusic

Curb Records albums
Jo Dee Messina albums
2002 Christmas albums
Christmas albums by American artists
Country Christmas albums
Albums produced by Brent Maher